Lin Baoyi (1864–1930) was a Chinese admiral during late Qing dynasty and the warlord era.

Born in Fuzhou, he was educated at the local naval academy and was sent to Britain for further studies.  Lin rose to become an admiral in the Beiyang fleet during the Qing dynasty and continued to serve in the Republic.  In 1917, reacting against Duan Qirui's dominance over the Beiyang government, he defected with his ships to Sun Yat-sen's rival Constitutional Protection government in South China.  For his actions, he was made a member of the governing committee and navy minister.  Soon a split emerged within the committee with him siding with the Old Guangxi clique against Sun.  Sun's forces, led by Chen Jiongming, defeated him and his Guangxi allies in 1920.

References 
 Linda Pomerantz-Zhang, Wu Tingfang (1842-1922): Reform and Modernization in Modern Chinese History, Hong Kong University Press, Pages 254, 260 & 262

Republic of China warlords from Fujian
Chinese admirals
Qing dynasty admirals
1863 births
1927 deaths
Generals from Fujian
Politicians from Fuzhou
Beiyang Fleet personnel